The Salonta gas field natural gas field is located near Salonta in Bihor County. It was discovered in 2010 and developed by Expert Petroleum and MOL Group. It will begin production in 2010 and will produce natural gas and condensates. The total proven reserves of the Salonta gas field are around 230 billion cubic feet (6.6 km³), and production is slated to be around 54.5 million cubic feet/day (1.55×105m³) in 2010.

References

Natural gas fields in Romania